Badodar railway station  is a railway station serving in Junagadh district of Gujarat State of India. It is under Bhavnagar railway division of Western Railway Zone of Indian Railways. Passenger, Express trains halt here.

Trains 

The following trains halt at Badodar railway station in both directions:

 19569/70 Rajkot - Veraval Express

References

Railway stations in Junagadh district
Bhavnagar railway division